I. Ganesan is an Indian politician and former Member of the Legislative Assembly of Tamil Nadu. He was elected to the Tamil Nadu legislative assembly as an Anna Dravida Munnetra Kazhagam candidate from Edapadi constituency in 1977, and 1980 elections and as a Pattali Makkal Katchi candidate in 1996, and 2001 elections.

References 

All India Anna Dravida Munnetra Kazhagam politicians
Living people
Pattali Makkal Katchi politicians
Tamil Nadu MLAs 1996–2001
Tamil Nadu MLAs 2001–2006
Year of birth missing (living people)